The Type 052D destroyer (NATO/OSD Luyang III-class destroyer) is a class of guided-missile destroyers in the Chinese People's Liberation Army Navy. The Type 052D is a larger variant of the Type 052C; the Type 052D uses a canister-type, instead of revolver-type, vertical launching system (VLS) and has flat-panelled active electronically scanned array (AESA) radar. The new VLS is not limited to surface-to-air missiles, making the Type 052D China's first dedicated multi-role destroyer.

Etymology
The Type 052Ds are fitted with the four-panel Type 346A "Star of the Sea" (NATO reporting name: Dragon Eye) active electronically scanned array (AESA) radar system. Chinese media informally calls the Type 052D the Chinese Aegis, portraying it as a peer of contemporary United States Navy ships equipped with the Aegis Combat System. The appearance of the Type 052D, with flat-panelled radar and canister-based VLS, has encouraged this informal use.

Design

Sensors
The Type 052D is equipped with Type 346A AESA and Type 518 L-band radar.

The Type 052D is also equipped with both variable depth (VDS) and linear towed array sonar. The VDS is deployed through a hinged opening in the transom by a hydraulic lifting mechanism. The VDS body is a streamlined fairing fitted with Y-shaped hydrodynamic vanes for towing stability.

Armament
The Type 052D is the first Chinese surface combatant to use canister-based universal VLS, as opposed to the concentric type VLS carried aboard earlier vessels. 64 cells are carried; 32 forward and 32 aft. The VLS is reportedly an implementation of the GJB 5860-2006 standard. The VLS may fire the extended-range variant of the HHQ-9 surface-to-air missile, YJ-18 anti-ship cruise missiles, and CY-5 anti-submarine missiles.

The main gun is a 130 mm weapon.

Early units were completed with 7-barrelled Type 730 close-in weapon system (CIWS). This was replaced in later units by the larger 11-barrelled Type 1130 CIWS.

Data links
The Type 052D may be using the joint service integrated datalink system (JSIDLS) and naval common tactical data link (NCTDL). JSIDLS is equivalent to Link 16 and was certified in June 2012. NCTDL is a next-generation two-way encrypted data link with support for electro-optic and laser pod UAVs; it replaces the older HN-900.

Propulsion
The powerplant is a combined diesel or gas (CODOG) system with two  QC-280 gas turbines and two  MTU 20V 956TB92 diesel engines.

Stretched variant
The extended flight deck is likely intended for the Harbin Z-20 helicopter.

The variant was in production by 2018.

Ships of class

Gallery

See also

 ; United States
 ; Australia and Spain
 ; India
 ; India
 ; Japan
 ; South Korea
 ; French/Italy
 Type 45 destroyer; British
 Type 055 destroyer; China

References

Bibliography

Destroyer classes
Destroyers of the People's Liberation Army Navy